Jerry Owen Reynolds (born January 29, 1944) is an American former professional basketball coach and current executive in the NBA.

He coached the Sacramento Kings for two different stretches; once in 1987 and from 1988 through 1989.  He also served as the team's general manager. Jerry Reynolds served as general manager of the Sacramento Monarchs WNBA team, a post from which he retired in 2003.

Reynolds is from French Lick, Indiana, the same town as NBA legend Larry Bird.

In 2005, Jerry Reynolds wrote a book about his 20 years of experiences with the Kings called Reynolds Remembers Tales from the Sacramento Kings.

As of the 2016–17 NBA season, Reynolds is a broadcaster for the Kings, alongside Grant Napear, and its director of player personnel.

Prior to his NBA tenure, Reynolds enjoyed a successful coaching career in the college ranks; he was part of the staff at Vincennes University when the Trailblazers won the 1970 NJCAA National title.  Later, he was on Roger Kaiser's staff at West Georgia College when the Braves won the 1974 NAIA Division I men's basketball tournament.

He began his coaching career as the Freshmen Head Coach during the 1965-66 season, while completing his undergraduate degree. He then returned to Vincennes as an assistant, before joining Roger Kaiser's staff at West Georgia.  In 1975, he was named the head coach of the Rockhurst University Hawks; he joined the Kansas City Kings franchise in 1984.

Reynolds is a graduate of Vincennes University and Oakland City University; he was awarded an Honorary Doctorate in 1990 from Vincennes. He lives in Roseville, California with his wife Dodie; they married in 1968.

He was inducted in the University of West Georgia Hall of Fame in 1991.  He was selected for induction into the Indiana Basketball Hall of Fame in December, 2019.  The ceremony will be held in 2020.

Head coaching record

|-
| align="left" |Sacramento
| align="left" |
|36||15||21||.417|| align="center" |5th in Midwest||—||—||—||—
| align="center" |Missed Playoffs
|- 
| align="left" |Sacramento
| align="left" |
|24||7||17||.292|| align="center" |6th in Midwest||—||—||—||—
| align="center" |Missed Playoffs
|-
| align="left" |Sacramento
| align="left" |
|82||27||55||.329|| align="center" |6th in Pacific||—||—||—||—
| align="center" |Missed Playoffs
|- 
| align="left" |Sacramento
| align="left" |
|28||7||21||.250|| align="center" |7th in Pacific||—||—||—||—
| align="center" |Missed Playoffs
|-
|-class="sortbottom"
| align="left" |Career
| ||170||56||114||.329|| ||0||0||0||.0

References

External links
 BasketballReference.com: Jerry Reynolds

1944 births
Living people
Basketball coaches from Indiana
Basketball players from Indiana
College men's basketball head coaches in the United States
Oakland City University alumni
People from French Lick, Indiana
Pittsburg State Gorillas men's basketball coaches
Rockhurst Hawks men's basketball coaches
Sacramento Kings assistant coaches
Sacramento Kings announcers
Sacramento Kings executives
Sacramento Kings head coaches
Vincennes Trailblazers men's basketball coaches
Vincennes Trailblazers men's basketball players
West Georgia Wolves men's basketball coaches
American men's basketball players